The Branson Micropolitan Statistical Area, as defined by the United States Census Bureau, is an area consisting of two counties in southwestern Missouri, anchored by the city of Branson. After the 2012 estimates the Branson Micropolitan area is part of the Springfield Combined Metropolitan area.

As of the 2010 census it had a population of 83,877.

Counties
Stone
Taney

Communities

Places with more than 10,000 inhabitants
Branson (Principal city) Pop: 10,520

Places with 1,000 to 5,000 inhabitants
Hollister Pop: 4,426
Kimberling City Pop: 2,400
Forsyth Pop: 2,255
Merriam Woods Pop: 1,761
Crane Pop: 1,462
Shell Knob (partial; census-designated place) Pop: 1,379
Kissee Mills (census-designated place) Pop: 1,109

Places with less than 1,000 inhabitants
Reeds Spring Pop: 913
Rockaway Beach Pop: 841
Bull Creek Pop: 603
Indian Point Pop: 528
Branson West Pop: 478
Galena Pop: 440
Taneyville Pop: 396
McCord Bend Pop: 297
Kirbyville Pop: 207
Saddlebrooke (partial) Pop: 202
Hurley Pop: 178
Blue Eye Pop: 167
Coney Island Pop: 75

Unincorporated places
Bradleyville
Brownbranch
Cape Fair
Carr Lane
Cedar Creek
Crossroads
Elsey
Hilda
Lampe
McClurg
Point Lookout

Ponce de Leon
Powersite
Protem
Reeds Spring Junction
Ridgedale
Rueter
Table Rock
Union City
Viola (partial)
Walnut Shade

Demographics
As of the census of 2000, there were 68,361 people, 27,980 households, and 19,894 families residing within the area. The racial makeup was 96.82% White, 0.23% African American, 0.76% Native American, 0.28% Asian, 0.05% Pacific Islander, 0.54% from other races, and 1.33% from two or more races. Hispanic or Latino of any race were 1.84% of the population.

The median income for a household in the area was $31,768, and the median income for a family was $36,801. Males had a median income of $25,828 versus $19,423 for females. The per capita income for the area was $17,652.

See also
Missouri census statistical areas

References

 

 
Taney County, Missouri
Stone County, Missouri
Micropolitan areas of Missouri